The Apprentice 2 is the second season of The Apprentice, which began on September 9, 2004, on NBC. Although this season did not match the ratings of the first and dropped out of the Top 10 Nielsen, it still performed strongly overall, ranking  11 with an average of 16.14 million viewers.

Season changes
This season featured 18 candidates, whereas the first season only had 16.

Three new twists were introduced to The Apprentice this season. First, each team was unexpectedly forced at the season's outset to make a 1-for-1 player swap, resulting in a male on the female team (Bradford), and a female on the male team (Pamela). The traded members then became the project managers for the first task. Second, it was revealed that a project manager for the winning team would be immune from being fired the following week.

Finally, the losing project manager could choose either two or three people to bring to the boardroom to be considered for firing. The option to take three people to the boardroom was only used twice, with the first person (Ivana Ma) who did so making the decision after pressure to do so from Donald Trump.

The candidates

Teams

1 – In an unannounced move, Trump fired two candidates week 11. Boren was fired first.
2 – As planned, Trump fired two candidates week 14. Allen was fired first.

Weekly results

Elimination Table

 The candidate was on the losing team.
 The candidate was hired and won the competition.
 The candidate won as project manager on his/her team.
 The candidate lost as project manager on his/her team.
 The candidate was brought to the final boardroom.
 The candidate was fired.
 The candidate lost as project manager and was fired.

Weekly summary

Week 1: Toying with Disaster
 Air date: September 9
 Apex project manager: Bradford
 Mosaic project manager: Pamela
 Task: Develop a new toy for Mattel. The product deemed most viable would be the winner.
 Judges: Donald Trump; Carolyn Kepcher; George H. Ross
 Trump monologue: Be Quick But Be Careful – To be quick and not careful is a bad decision. Trump prefers if somebody carefully takes their time and makes the right decision; but a good decision made quickly is the best combination.
 Result: The team with mostly men (Mosaic) developed a line of mutated animal Transformers called "Crustacean Nation". The team with mostly women (Apex) developed a radio controlled car called the Meta-morpher with parts that interchange.   
 Winning Team: Apex
 Reasons for win: The Mattel executives felt that Apex's product was more innovative, and would generate more money in the longer term due to the potential for selling add-on packs containing new parts.
 Reward: Dinner with Trump and Melania Knauss.
 Dramatic tension: When deciding on corporation names, Raj clearly disliked his team's name (Mosaic), as he wanted to name the team Empire and thought Mosaic was a "fruity toot" name, and even Donald Trump believed it was not good. Trump was also puzzled that Raj decided to bring a cane with him to the first task. On Apex, Bradford struggled to fit in with his all-female team, and Stacie J. completely alienated the members of her team during the wait before a winning team was decided. On Mosaic, Pamela makes fun of the weight and haircuts of the children in the focus group, which offended Carolyn.
 Losing Team: Mosaic
 Reasons for loss: Their toy was felt to be generic and lacking in any unique selling point, and Mosaic's presentation was also felt to not be as good as Apex's.
 Sent to boardroom: Pamela, Rob, Andy
 Initial boardroom: In the boardroom, several team members state that Rob did not contribute as much as he could have, but Rob claimed he was underutilized. He also curtly cuts off Carolyn in the boardroom when she interrupts him to ask a question. Although he came up with the "Crustacean Nation" concept, Andy insisted that he was brought into the final boardroom simply because of his youth. Ultimately Trump was not impressed with Rob feeling he could've contributed even though he wasn't asked and decided he would be the first to be fired
 Fired: Rob Flanagan – for not being assertive in the task, not coming forward with his ideas, and being very disrespectful towards Carolyn. While Pamela lead the team to defeat with the poor presentation, and he questioned Andy's youth, he felt both had potential and decided Rob's inability to contribute and poor enthusiasm made him the obvious decision to be fired.
 Notes:
 On September 14, 2004, Mattel announced that they would begin producing the winning toy under the name Morph Machines. It retailed for $30 and became available in early 2005.
 Episode One Recap at NBC.com
 Read the Episode 1 Recap at Yahoo!'s Apprentice 2 Website

Week 2: Scoop Dreams
 Air date: September 16 (A special 2 hour version aired on NBC on September 18)
 Apex project manager: Ivana
 Mosaic project manager: Kelly
 Task: Create, develop and market a new flavor of ice cream with the Ciao Bella Gelato Company for the Trump Ice Cream Parlour.
 Judges: Donald Trump; Carolyn Kepcher; George H. Ross
 Trump Monologue: Get Organized – A lack of organization is a lack of leadership and without leadership, success is impossible.
 Result: Mosaic developed a flavor made of various types of doughnuts. Apex's flavor was based on Red velvet cake.
 Dramatic tension: Although both teams initially struggled to find a place to market their ice cream, Mosaic made a critical error when they left their business plan in the open for Apex to read. The men also struggled dealing with John, after he demanded that the team forgo any sort of lunch or snack breaks so that they could sell ice cream all day and not spend any profit. When Raj stated that he had hypoglycemia, which would be grievously aggravated by not eating anything during the day, John started yelling at Raj, accusing him of being lazy and making up excuses. Kelly then told the team that every man would get $5 to buy some food during the day, and when John tried to argue against this Kelly simply told him "Got it. It's noted" and then gave everyone (including John) the petty cash.
 Winning Team: Mosaic
 Reasons for win: They made almost $250 more than the other team. Although they had to buy their own ingredients (namely donuts), they opted to give a portion to the Leukemia-Lymphoma Society as a marketing gimmick in a successful attempt to make more money. Kelly also ended up choosing a good location, which was near the Times Square branch of Toys "R" Us (the briefing location in the previous task), because he remembered Trump calling it the country's busiest toy store. Raj also came up with an idea that the men wear bowties to look like old fashioned ice cream men. After they won, project manager Kelly asked Trump if their entire winnings could be donated to the charity, to which Trump agreed.
 Reward: Dinner at the Petrossian
 Losing Team: Apex
 Reasons for loss: Apex started somewhat later than Mosaic, and were forced to move from their original sales location near the TKTS center when existing street vendors demanded to see their permit (it was not clear that they actually needed one for the task). In the process, Apex became separated and their carts lost contact with each other for several hours. Apex tried to bring the carts back together, but Stacie J. misidentified their location as the junction with 7th Avenue, when they were actually standing at the junction with Broadway. Though they eventually got the carts back together, and Jennifer C. made a bulk sale to a restaurant near the end of the day, the time lost when the carts were separated ultimately proved too much to overcome.
 Boardroom tension: Ivana was castigated for her unorganization and her loose leadership. Bradford messed up Carolyn's name, which visibly irked her. Ivana stated that Stacie J. was responsible for losing the cart for as long as they did and that she needed supervision. George was puzzled that the team couldn't see each other as 7th and Broadway were half a block apart. Trump asked Bradford to be frank about Ivana's performance, noting that he was the only person in a position to do so, thanks to his immunity. This led to Bradford offering to waive his exemption, and he stated that because he felt like he performed to the best of his abilities, he did not need his immunity. Even though Apex collectively agreed that Ivana was a poor leader, they unanimously thought that Stacie J. was a bigger liability.
 Trump thoughts: Trump didn't like how Ivana was indecisive, and that she kept changing her mind about who and how many people to bring to the boardroom. He also felt that Jennifer C. shouldn't have been brought to the boardroom initially, because she brought in a huge profit. But when Jennifer C. kept interjecting her thoughts, it annoyed Trump, and he flirted with the idea of firing her. Overall, Trump was especially concerned with Bradford (who he explicitly identified as the strongest contestant in the final boardroom), and that his impulsive decision outweighed Ivana's bad leadership, Jennifer's interruptions, and Stacie not working well with the team, because Trump believed that Bradford would be able to instantly destroy a business with a stupid decision such as his.
 Sent to boardroom: Ivana, Stacie J., Jennifer C., and Bradford
 Fired: Bradford Cohen – for his rash decision to waive his exemption despite being deemed the strongest on the team.
 Notes:
 Bradford became the first candidate to ever leave Trump Tower without his luggage, because (due to being initially exempt) he did not pack his bags.
 As a result of his firing, Bradford has the dubious honor of lasting the shortest amount of time of any successful first-episode project manager (in any incarnation of the show).
 Ivana selected Jennifer C. and Bradford to go into the boardroom so they could advocate against Stacie J., and believing that because they had been the strongest performers on the task, this would give Trump no choice but to fire Stacie. While Bradford was happy to advocate for Ivana, Jennifer C. became angry at being brought back, and focused most of her criticism on Ivana rather than Stacie.
 Despite her error over the cart's location, Trump did not hold Stacie J. accountable for the loss, and heavily implied Ivana would have been fired had it not been for Bradford surrendering his immunity, as Carolyn repeatedly criticized Ivana, calling her a "poor leader".
 Episode Two recap at NBC.com
 Read the Episode 2 Recap at Yahoo!'s Apprentice 2 Website

Week 3: Send in the Crowns
 Air date: September 23
 Apex project manager: Elizabeth
 Mosaic project manager: Kevin
 Task: Develop a launch promotion for Crest's newest flavor of toothpaste. Each team has a budget of $50,000, and the winner will be chosen by executives from Procter & Gamble, Crest's parent company.
 Judges: Donald Trump; Carolyn Kepcher; George H. Ross
 Trump Monologue A Penny Saved is a Penny Saved – Trump is basically quite critical of the budget that is set. This could possibly be a typo, because the saying is typically A Penny Saved is a Penny Earned.
 Dramatic tension: There was a massive argument among the women before the task even began, with Maria, Ivana, Sandy and Stacy R. openly telling Stacie J. that they considered her mentally unstable and did not wish to continue working with her. Elizabeth and both the Jennifers did not question Stacie J.'s state of mind, but still considered her the weakest on the team. Stacie J. did little to help win over her teammates when she suggested giving away over a thousand tubes of toothpaste, only for it to turn out that this amount was far more than they could feasibly carry, forcing them to spend much of the morning of their event transporting it to their location. On Mosaic, Andy came up with an idea to purchase an insurance policy for a million dollar giveaway, intending to set the giveaway up so that in all likelihood nobody would win, but that the policy would protect them in case anyone did. However, Procter & Gamble forbade Mosaic to have the giveaway, saying that there were too many legal problems. The team were forced to come up with a new idea at the last minute, and a dejected Andy realized he would almost certainly be fired if the team lost.
 Result: Apex selects Mike Piazza to endorse the toothpaste at a cost of $20,000. Mosaic, after an abortive attempt to have a million dollar contest, gives away several smaller $5,000 prizes, with circus performers entertaining the crowds.
 Winning Team: Mosaic
 Reasons for win: The Procter & Gamble executives felt that Mosaic's event was actually inferior to Apex's, and that it lacked any big idea or central theme. Despite this, the event still went well and raised enough buzz that, combined with Apex's fatal blunder, the team were still awarded the win.
 Reward: Dinner on 
 Losing Team: Apex
 Reasons for loss: Despite feeling that Apex clearly had the better event (mostly due to Piazza's involvement), the team exceeded their budget by over $5,000, which the executives felt was too much for them to be awarded the win. Elizabeth blamed Maria because of her sloppy contract negotiations, which allowed the company in charge of producing their publicity material to invoke an overtime clause and inflated their original $1,850 estimate to a final price of $6,950.
 Sent to boardroom: Elizabeth, Maria, Stacie J.
 Trump thoughts: At first, Trump didn't understand why Ivana was not brought back into the boardroom, because she was responsible for monitoring the budget and only allotted $500 (1% of the total budget) for overspend, which wasn't nearly enough to handle a major budgetary crisis. Elizabeth disagreed and said that Maria and Stacie J. were both more responsible for the loss than Ivana (although Elizabeth had the opportunity to bring Ivana back). Trump asked why Stacie J. was brought back, and Maria then brought up the incident with Stacie J. in the first task and how everyone on the team was very frightened by it. While he felt Elizabeth was a poor leader for not even knowing Apex had exceeded their budget until the task result was announced, and that Maria should have taken accountability for the bad deal she made, Trump became concerned with Apex's feelings concerning Stacie. He called everyone from Apex back to the boardroom to discuss their feelings about Stacie J.'s behavior during the first task. When brought back, all the women agreed that Stacie J. acted very odd, Ivana went as far as calling Stacie J.'s actions "borderline schizophrenic," and Sandy and Stacy R. in particular viciously attacked Stacie J., saying they didn't feel comfortable being in the same room as her and would not even trust her with menial work. Although Stacie J. insisted that she wasn't crazy, and Jennifer M. pointed out that Stacie hadn't displayed any more strange behavior in the previous two tasks, Trump told her that something must have happened because her entire team was concerned with her behavior.
 Fired: Stacie Jones Upchurch – for being a distraction within her team and due to fears that she is mentally unstable.
 Notes:
 For the first time in the American version of The Apprentice, the entire team is called back into the boardroom by Trump.
 Episode Three recap at NBC.com
 Read the Episode 3 Recap at Yahoo!'s Apprentice 2 Website

Week 4: The Last Supper
 Air date: September 29
 Apex project manager: Jennifer C.
 Mosaic project manager: Raj
 Task: Open a new restaurant in 24 hours. Each team would be given an empty space in Manhattan. They would be responsible for chef selection, decor and stocking the restaurant. The winner would be the team that scored the highest on the Zagat Survey of customers.
 Judges: Donald Trump; Carolyn Kepcher; Bill Rancic
 Result: Apex chose an Asian fusion theme while Mosaic went with standard American.
 Trump Monologue: Be Respected – There are several varied traits of a leader, however respect is the common trait in all of them, without respect one can not be a leader.
 Dramatic tension: Kevin and Raj, along with Jennifer M., lambasted the women for their treatment of Stacie J., and Elizabeth is attacked for choosing her to go to the boardroom in the previous episode, much to Elizabeth's annoyance, as she had actually brought Stacie back for wasting the team's time with the bulk delivery, rather than her past behavior despite being told consistently that was not why they lost. Stacy R. and Jennifer M. met with Zagat's people beforehand and tried to convince Jennifer C. that going with the complicated Asian fusion concept was a bad idea, but Jennifer C. stuck with it anyway. Apex continued to struggle throughout the task, and Elizabeth even had a breakdown when she felt that she was being set up for failure. Stacy R. took offense at Jennifer C.'s judgment of two Jewish women who were over-critical of their restaurant, and they clashed over this before the boardroom.
 Winning Team: Mosaic
 Reasons for win: Their restaurant received a very positive review from the survey and a score of 61 points, outscoring Apex in all aspects except, ironically, the actual food. They mostly won out due to the strong scores in the customer service and décor areas.
 Reward: A meeting with Rudy Giuliani.
 Losing Team: Apex
 Reasons for loss: They got a score of 57 points, losing by just 4 points, but did particularly worse in the decor and service category than the men did. The women were also reprimanded for the overall appearance, for although they had chic style clothing and a nice modern look to their restaurant, it did not fit with their middle-class locale. Guest judge Bill Rancic also noted that Apex did not have a lot of energy throughout their service and seemed very tense, which the women blamed on Jennifer C's abrasive leadership.
 Trump thoughts: Trump felt Apex should have hired a cleaning crew the night before like Mosaic to avoid fatigue the next day. He was also surprised that Sandy was not called back to the boardroom, because she was responsible for the poor design in the restaurant. Jennifer C. was suspected of bringing Elizabeth and Stacy R. mainly for personal reasons, because Trump and his advisors knew that Sandy was primarily responsible for the loss, because she produced the restaurant decor that scored poorly.
 Sent to boardroom: Jennifer C., Elizabeth, Stacy R.
 Fired: Jennifer Crisafulli – for her bad leadership and terrible decision making, which included not bringing in Sandy for the boardroom and for her comments on the Jewish women. Trump saw no reason to fire Elizabeth or Stacy R. and called Jennifer C.'s firing "easy".
 Notes:
 This episode is moved to this day due to US Presidential debate.
 Bill Rancic, last season's winner, fills in for George Ross on this task.
 Jennifer Crisafulli was fired from her job at a real estate agency in Manhattan the day after this episode aired. The firm cited her comments regarding the Jewish women as the reason for her dismissal.
 When the men were briefing about customer service, it seemed Chris was the only one who had expertise in customer service. He used numerous curse words when talking about how to be a server and told the men he "hates the public" to their laughter. Raj later said he hoped Chris could put his grudge behind him.
 Episode Four recap at NBC.com
 Read the Episode 4 Recap at Yahoo!'s Apprentice 2 Website

Week 5: Lights! Camera! Transaction!
 Airdate: October 7
 Corporate shuffle: Trump sent Pamela over to Apex and he appointed her as the project manager for this task, setting up the "battle of the sexes" once again.
 Apex project manager: Pamela
 Mosaic project manager: Chris
 Task: Select a product from the QVC inventory and sell it on-air. The winner would be the team that has the most gross sales.
 Judges: Donald Trump; Carolyn Kepcher; George H. Ross
 Trump Monologue: Price is Right – The right price is extremely important, if the price is marginally high it can kill the marketed products or restaurant, if it is marginally lower it can do wonders, pricing is very important.
 Result: Apex chose a cleaning product called "It Works!". Mosaic went with a more costly electric sandwich maker.
 Dramatic tension: Pamela begins her leadership of Apex with a speech where she admonishes the team for their behavior, and during her speech, Pamela criticizes them for interrupting and not paying attention to people when they are speaking. Raj and Kelly disagreed over the price of the sandwich maker; Raj argued that setting it at a slightly lower price might lead more people to buy it, but Kelly insisted that it should be sold over the $70 price point. Chris, the project manager, accepted Kelly's idea, and although it annoyed Raj, it was key in getting the victory for Mosaic.
 Winning Team: Mosaic
 Reasons for win: Mosaic barely squeaked by, winning by only $10, even though they sold far fewer units.
 Reward: Tennis practice at the Arthur Ashe Stadium with John McEnroe and Anna Kournikova. During the reward, Raj tempts the fates and makes a pass at Anna, who agrees to date him if he can return any of her serves. He fails, and is forced to run around the Arthur Ashe Stadium in his boxers while John, Anna and the rest of the men hit tennis balls at him.
 Losing Team: Apex
 Reasons for loss: Despite an overall strong effort, the team just fell short. Trump felt that if they had dropped their price a little lower, it would have boosted their sales by enough to carry them to victory.
 Trump thoughts: Trump expressed admiration for Pamela for being able to switch over to Apex and become the project manager, but he was also concerned that she couldn't admit she lost. Pamela kept saying it was a tie, but both Trump and his advisors strongly disagreed, and they felt that it was the price of the item which caused Apex to lose. Pamela, however, believed that Apex would have won if their item was priced even higher. Stacey R. also criticized Pamela's laid-back approach to the legal work involved in the task leading to tell Trump, "If you want another Enron on your hands Mr. Trump, here's Pamela."
 Sent to boardroom: Pamela, Stacy R., Maria
 Fired: Pamela Day – for her overconfident leadership skills, lack of assessment skills, and for setting the price of the item too high, which ultimately caused her team to fail. Trump also felt that she couldn't admit she was wrong, that she was a poor judge of her team's skills, and assigned them to the wrong jobs.
 Episode Five recap at NBC.com
 Read the Episode 5 Recap at Yahoo!'s Apprentice 2 Website
 This is the fourth week in a row that Apex has lost a task, and the fourth week in a row that Mosaic won a task.

Week 6: Crimes of Fashion
 Airdate: October 14
 Apex project manager: Maria
 Mosaic project manager: John
 Task: Select a designer, develop a clothing line to present at a fashion show for buyers from several upscale department stores. The team with the highest revenue from orders wins.
 Judges: Donald Trump; Carolyn Kepcher; George H. Ross
 Trump Monologue: Know Your Market – Trump reflects on all his endeavors, and discusses the importance of the demographic the product is catered towards.
 Result: The women's team worked very smoothly, completing the task without any major problems and had a designer who accommodated them by walking them through most of the steps. The men's team floundered throughout the task, partly because their designer was not helpful.
 Dramatic tension: Several women on Apex believed that Elizabeth was a distraction, and Maria had to divert her away from the group in order to get the task done more efficiently. On the men's team, Kelly rose to occasion by organizing the team, even though Raj was slowing the team down and John was the project manager. Mosaic's designer also failed to complete production of the clothes. Part of this was attributed to Raj constantly getting information, wasting time, and leading to an argument with Kelly during completion.
 Winning Team: Apex
 Reasons for victory: Apex made roughly triple the sales revenue of Mosaic. While their overall execution of the task was virtually flawless, Maria was widely credited as having been the perfect choice to lead the team due to her knowledge of the industry.
 Reward: A celebrity party with Cirque du Soleil
 Losing Team: Mosaic
 Reasons for loss: In stark contrast to the other team, Mosaic's execution of the task was an absolute disaster. The team's products were priced too high, unanimously condemned as unappealing by the buyers due to their fabric choices, and John proved an extremely ineffective leader.
 Trump thoughts: Trump felt that Mosaic set their prices too high, which resulted in lower sales. He continued to be puzzled by the tactic of bringing only two people into the boardroom, and also wondered why John would bring only one of the two people responsible for pricing and not the other, especially when John had the opportunity to bring back all three men (Kevin, Wes, and Andy).
 Sent to boardroom: John, Kevin, Andy
 Fired: John Willenborg – for making too many mistakes, including choosing a bad designer, not being involved in the pricing decisions, allowing Kelly to lead the men, bringing Andy into the final boardroom, and for not bringing in Wes otherwise, after both Kevin and Wes were jointly responsible for the bad pricing.
 Notes: Although it was acknowledged that Kevin and Wes were responsible for the loss, Raj and Kelly suggested that Andy should be brought into the final boardroom, because of his overall performances in the tasks were seen as lackluster.
 Episode Six recap at NBC.com
 Read the Episode 6 Recap at Yahoo!'s Apprentice 2 Website

Week 7: Barking Up the Wrong Tree
 Airdate: October 21
 Apex project manager: Jennifer M.
 Mosaic project manager: Wes
 Corporate restructuring: After the project managers were chosen, Trump told both of them to select three players that they did not want on their team.  The chosen players would go to the opposing team, leaving them with three men and three women each. Jennifer M. chose Sandy, Maria, and Stacy R. to go to Mosaic. Wes chose Raj, Chris, and Kevin to go to Apex.
 Task: Create a dog service business in the Central Park area and organize a sales event, with the winning team being the one that makes the most profit.
 Judges: Donald Trump; Carolyn Kepcher; Allen Weisselberg
 Trump Monologue: Sell Your Ideas – Similar to last season's monologue Believe in Your Product, Trump talks about the necessity to have faith in one's products or ideas in order to sell them successfully.
 Winning Team: Apex, with nearly triple the sales revenue of Mosaic.
 Reasons for victory: Apex was able to expand their services beyond washing by offering dog massages and nail clippings. As a result, they earned $307.41 in sales revenue.
 Reward: A meeting with Michael Bloomberg.
 Losing Team: Mosaic
 Reasons for loss: Mosaic got off to a late start and was unable to come up with a solid business plan, and Stacy R. spent more time arguing with Wes than trying to sell her ideas. With that being said, Andy left the team's cellphone in a taxi cab, leaving them unable to coordinate between different locations. As a result, they earned $122.12 in sales revenue.
 Sent to boardroom: Wes, Andy, and Stacy R.
 Trump thoughts: Trump was astounded that Andy could make such a basic mistake as losing the team's cellphone, but Andy was able to make an eloquent defense of himself, and Trump ultimately decided that he should stay, though warned him to step up to the plate on the next task. While Wes was accused of having been a follower rather than a leader on many of the tasks, and Andy stated that Kelly had led this task more than Wes, by far the biggest criticism was aimed at Stacy R., whom Carolyn accused of having failed to make a single positive contribution on any of the seven tasks. Stacy's only defense was to complain about her teammates not listening to her. Trump felt that Stacy took no responsibility for her failures and invested too much energy in complaining with her teammates, which he felt was reason enough to fire her despite Wes and Andy's mistakes.
 Fired: Stacy Rotner – for being unable to sell her ideas, refusing to take responsibility for any of her actions, making too many excuses for her shortcomings, annoying several of the other candidates, and for being widely agreed to have been ineffectual throughout the season.
 Notes:
 The cast was expecting Andy to be fired and were openly surprised when he came back and they found out that Stacy R. had been fired instead.
 Episode Seven recap at NBC.com
 Read the Episode 7 Recap at Yahoo!'s Apprentice 2 Website

Week 8: A Tale of Two Leaders
 Airdate: October 28
 Apex project manager: Elizabeth
 Mosaic project manager: Andy
 Task: Create a recruiting ad campaign for the New York Police Department with Donny Deutsch's advertising firm.
 Judges: Donald Trump; Carolyn Kepcher; George H. Ross
 Trump Monologue: You Have to Love It – In order to work for Trump, he needs to see a genuine drive and dedication that is visible by how much potential employees love what they do.
 Winning Team: Mosaic
 Reasons for win: Despite constantly battling with Maria (who wanted more sexuality in the ad) and Kelly (who felt they should go with a more militaristic theme), Andy stuck to his original concept of aiming for the heart and made an advert asking viewers when the last time that they saved a life or made their family proud. Donny Deutsch felt it wasn't even close, and awarded the win to Mosaic
 Reward: Watching their ad played on a large screen in Times Square.
 Losing Team: Apex
 Reasons for loss: The team went with a theme promoting the idea of the NYPD as a military force battling terrorism, which was heavily pushed by Raj and Chris. Not only did this not fit the original brief, the execution made it look like New York City was a police state, which Donny said would more likely deter potential recruits than encourage them to join. The team blamed Elizabeth for the loss, as she constantly rejected ideas and wavered on the ones she did have, only opting for the military theme at the last possible moment and proving such a weak leader that both Chris and Kevin threatened to take control from her at various points in the task.
 Initial Boardroom: Despite the ideas behind their advert being Raj's, the other candidates defended him as it was the only idea they had for the task since Elizabeth threw away all other ideas. Trump questioned Elizabeth's leadership style, given her two failures as project manager and because it was widely accepted by her team that she was incompetent, especially by Jennifer M., who criticized her by calling her weak, incompetent, and indecisive to "the point of paralysis", and when Trump asked Jennifer, "Other than that you thought she was great?", she responded by saying, "Other than that I thought she was terrible!" 
 Sent to boardroom: No final boardroom – Usually, Trump would allow a PM to bring back 1-3 people back in the final boardroom. But when asked by Trump whether bringing back two or three people & who she would back to the boardroom with her, Elizabeth stated that she would bring two and chose Raj and Chris. However, Trump felt Elizabeth's decision wasn't necessary and immediately fires her on the spot, stating he didn't "want to waste a lot of time" seeing that Elizabeth's poor leadership made her the very obvious choice to be fired.
 Fired: Elizabeth Jarosz – for being too indecisive, allowing her team to change her mind, being universally deemed weak by her team, and for her very poor leadership. Trump fired her on the spot, without letting her bring Chris and Raj to the boardroom.
 Notes:
 This is the first time in the history of The Apprentice that a candidate was fired without the need of a final boardroom.
 After Elizabeth's elimination, Trump rarely said "sorry" to the people who was still sitting without a final boardroom.
 Episode Eight recap at NBC.com
 Read the Episode 8 Recap at Yahoo!'s Apprentice 2 Website

Week 9: Bringing Down the House
 Airdate: November 4
 Apex project manager: Raj
 Mosaic project manager: Sandy
 Task: With a $20,000 budget (and the help of 2 previously fired candidates), each team would renovate a home in the suburbs of Long Island. The team who has increased the value of their home by the highest percentage and raised by increase profit would win. Rob and Jennifer C. joined Mosaic and Stacie J. and Bradford were assigned to Apex.
 Judges: Donald Trump; Carolyn Kepcher; Matthew Calamari
 Trump Monologue: Control Your Contractor – Trump talks about contractors and he states that although they may not have gone to Harvard, they aren't inferior. They are tough, smart and can steal inconspicuously.
 Dramatic tension: Stacie J. went on the offensive, attacking Ivana and the other women for labeling her crazy weeks ago. Ivana was unapologetic however, and said that she stood by every word she had said about Stacie J., even going so far as to say she should not have been invited back for a task of this sort.
 Winning Team: Mosaic
 Reasons for win: The team focused on improving and modernizing the existing infrastructure of the house. Despite initial problems caused by their contractor working slowly in the beginning, Andy found a second contractor who brought in many members of his family to get the job finished in time. Mosaic's original house was praised $390,000 to an increase of $430,000 by 10.26%.
 Reward: A trip to a country house with a private beach.
 Losing Team: Apex
 Reasons for loss: While Apex's plan was more ambitious, there were two fatal flaws. Firstly, Raj decided to knock out a wall and combine two of the bedrooms, turning it from a four bedroom into a three bedroom house, which cancelled out much of the value increase made by the other improvements. Secondly, their contractor proved lazy and ineffective, and left the downstairs rooms in a mess, and the new upstairs bathroom nowhere being finished. As a result, their house was originally praised $385,000 into $412,500 with only a value increase of just 7.14%.
 Trump thoughts: Trump was very impressed with Rob's work and enthusiasm even though he was previously fired. He questioned the wisdom of making a four bedroom house into three bedrooms, pointing out that this may have cost them the win. He didn't like Ivana's cattiness toward Stacie J., although it seemed Ivana's anger was aimed mostly at Jennifer M. for politicking on Stacie J.'s behalf. Jennifer M. and Raj decide to target Ivana in the boardroom, but their efforts misfire when Trump says that Ivana didn't belong in the final boardroom.
 Sent to boardroom: Raj, Ivana, Kevin
 Fired: Raj Bhakta - for choosing three bedrooms over four, not finishing the task, targeting Ivana instead of Kevin in the initial boardroom, and for not bringing Chris into the final boardroom. While Ivana's behavior towards Stacie J was questionable Trump didn't see her at fault for the loss and while Kevin did pick the contractor that caused them to lose, Trump cited that Raj made too many mistakes, a detriment to The Trump Organization.
 Notes:
 Matthew Calamari is the sub judge for George Ross.
 Jennifer M. told Raj she would support him in the Boardroom and that they should focus on getting Ivana fired. Unfortunately, Jen attacked Ivana in the suite stating "you're not good for anything but filling out spreadsheets" and mocking the idea that the "barely producing" Ivana would bring down someone as great as herself; this alerted Ivana to defend herself, which she did strongly and led to the quick focus for potential firing on either Raj or Chris.
 Trump wore a tuxedo to the boardroom meeting as he was giving out an award at a hotel later that night, and remarked that it would be a "formal firing."
 When Trump released Chris and Jennifer M. from the initial boardroom, Chris turned to Trump and said that he didn't think Apex had any chance of winning another task due to the poor atmosphere within the team. Trump was outraged by this act of disloyalty and offered Raj the chance to bring Chris back into the final boardroom, but Raj refused to do this, saying that Chris wasn't to blame for the loss, and on prompting from Matthew, Chris volunteered to lead the team the following week. In the final boardroom, Trump told Raj that he would absolutely have fired Chris had he been brought back.
 After Raj is eliminated, he asked Robin Himmler for her phone number; while she didn't give him the number at the time, she later revealed she and Raj did go out for coffee after the show was over.
 Episode Nine recap at NBC.com
 Read the Episode 9 Recap at Yahoo!'s Apprentice 2 Website

Week 10: Runaway Pride
 Airdate: November 11
 Apex project manager: Chris
 Mosaic project manager: Kelly
 The task: Open a bridal shop and sell dresses. The winning team would conclude as to who earns the most profit in their final sales.
 Mosaic had a huge advantage in this task because they had Sandy, who had worked in a successful bridal shop before the show, on their team.
 Judges: Donald Trump; Carolyn Kepcher; George H. Ross
 Trump Monologue: Believe In Yourself – Echoing the age old theme of a positive attitude and self-confidence.
 Task tension: On Mosaic, the marketing team (Wes and Maria) did not include the telephone number on the appointment flyer, frustrating the rest of the team. And Maria did not take accountability for that mistake. Sandy was worried about Kelly's leadership relying too much on her expertise, and the team's ability to attract the customers into the store. While on Apex, Chris often gave up that he felt this task was impossible, which irritated his teammates. Jen's position was weakened with most of her team because of her unsuccessful effort to get rid of Ivana the previous week, and Ivana and Kevin jointly ignored Jen during the task and left her to provide no useful assistance to Chris.
 Winning team: Mosaic, their sales stood at $12,788.94 and sold 27 dresses. They began their marketing plan earlier than Apex, composing email blasts, despite that their appointment document did not include the telephone number.
 Losing team: Apex, their sales were only $1,060.47 and they only sold two dresses. Apex did not have any marketing strategy. All they did was to hand out flyers at Grand Central Terminal & Penn Station, which didn't attract any customers to their bridal shop.
 Trump's thoughts: Donald and his advisors disliked they were handing out flyers at Penn Station or Grand Central, which does not sell marriage. He also disliked  that Chris didn't back Jennifer M., saying she was just as responsible (despite Jennifer being responsible for stocking the vendors).
 Sent to boardroom: Chris, Kevin, Ivana. Chris weakly apologized for letting Jennifer go back to the suite instead of them, saying he liked them better than her and making an incredibly lame explanation that he'd gone along with what Jen herself told them on the task. Kevin just laughed at him and said "It's OK man. She screwed you over, she got you" as Chris miserably hung his head.
 Fired: Chris Russo - for mentally checking out of the task early on, losing the drive he had in previous tasks, not bringing back Jennifer Massey into the final boardroom, having poor leadership skills and leading his team to a crushing defeat.
 Episode Ten recap at NBC.com
 Read the Episode 10 Recap at Yahoo!'s Apprentice 2 Website
 Mosaic hands Apex their third loss in a row.

Week 11: The Butt Stops Here
 Airdate: November 18, 2004
 Apex project manager: Kevin
 Mosaic project manager: Wes
 Task: The teams are asked to create an in-store advertising catalog for Levi's Jeans, judged by Levi's president.
 Judges: Donald Trump, Carolyn Kepcher and Bill Rancic
 Corporate Shuffle: Kelly is transferred to Apex to even the teams.
 Trump Monologue: Never Lose Your Cool – Trump discusses the importance of maintaining composure, noting that it can be used to inspire employees.
 Winning team: Apex, with a campaign revolving around "The Perfect Fit" and a circular wheel helping customers pick the style of pants that's right for them.
 Reward: Billy Joel concert
 Dramatic tension: Jennifer M. is left to do busywork because she didn't share the team's vision. She inserts herself into the campaign presentation, making herself appear responsible for the wheel which was Ivana's concept. The Levi's president tells Trump that Jennifer did the best job, angering Ivana. On Mosaic, Maria shuts Wes out of the photo shoot and refuses to let the rest of the team see their catalog. At one point during the task, Maria snapped at Wes to "back off." Andy faults Wes for being unable to control Maria and Sandy.
 Losing team: Mosaic did not clearly communicate the fit range nor the sponsor's brand message.
 Trump thoughts: Trump was peeved at both Maria and Wes for errors throughout the task. He called out Andy for being quiet in boardrooms, but accepted his smooth response. Carolyn felt that Sandy wasn't getting her point across and that Wes was a poor leader.
 Sent to boardroom: Wes, Sandy, Maria, Andy
 Fired:
 Maria Boren – For taking too much control, being unmanageable, disrespecting her team and superior, and a horrific presentation. Carolyn noted that any Trump Organization employee would be fired for telling her to "back off".
 Wes Moss – For feeble leadership and inability to control Maria, and allowing her to produce a horrible product. Whilst Maria was arguably the most responsible for the teams loss, Trump felt that he had no choice but to fire Wes as his poor leadership allowed his team to lose. 
 Notes:
 This was the first multi-firing (outside the interview stage) in the series. Because the dual departure was not planned, Maria and Wes shared a single taxi, with Wes stating in the exit interview: "I would have at least liked to have my own cab".

Week 12: The Pepsi Challenge

 Airdate: November 25
 Apex project manager: Kelly
 Mosaic project manager: Andy
 Task: The teams are asked to create a new bottle for Pepsi Edge, and present it to Pepsi's entire advertising team.
 Judges: Donald Trump; Carolyn Kepcher; George H. Ross
 Corporate shuffle: Jennifer M. is shunted onto Mosaic, which Ivana refers to as a tumor being lifted from the team.
 Trump Monologue: Form Your Own Opinion - As a leader Trump listens to his team, but in the end forms his own opinion. The leader that wants to be popular or to be loved, that leader ultimately is not going to make it.
 Result: Apex develops a bottle that has the letters D and G carved out of plastic, providing the grounds for a theme of hiding things in the inside of the D (referred to by the team as "What's in the box?").  Mosaic develops a theme of "The Best of Both Worlds", designed to appeal to the "dual users" of both diet and regular colas. The bottle is shaped like a regular Pepsi bottle with two halves of a globe on the bottom and top.  A contest revolving around collecting areas of a continent to win a "Trip to the Edge" is also proposed.
 Dramatic tension: Andy refused to let Pepsi employees eat their pizza when it was delivered, because they hadn't finished part of the task. He also gave cash incentives to the Pepsi employees, because he thought it would motivate them. Despite Sandy's clear objections, Andy (who was the project manager) gave the cash anyway.
 Winning team: Apex, because their bottle "represents what Pepsi Edge is all about"
 Reward: Racing Lamborghini Gallardos around a track.
 Losing team: Mosaic; Although they liked the label of the team's bottle, their bottle was unappealing for having a design of the bottle with blobs in it and felt like lifting a dumbbell (one of the advertising executives stated he didn't remember "when the last time geography was cool").
 Boardroom tension: Before the boardroom, Andy approaches Jennifer M. and proposes that they gang up on Sandy, because Andy believed that Jennifer did the better job. Over the course of the initial boardroom, Sandy figures this out, and begins to deride both of them for attempting it. Showered with a debate raging on both sides of him, Andy appeared helpless as Jennifer and Sandy scream at each other constantly until Trump bangs on the table to get their attention.
 Initial boardroom: George felt impressed with Sandy's defense, and felt Andy wasn't strong enough to have a winning concept and sitting there in front of two women being out-debated. Carolyn questioned why Jennifer M. gets defended by a project manager every time she's in the boardroom.
 Trump thoughts: Trump agreed with the ad executive's decision that the bottle was too boring, lifting it as a dumbbell at one point. Trump got upset at Andy for his performance in the task and when he started to get yelled at on both sides of the women during the boardroom.
 Sent to boardroom: Andy, Jennifer M., Sandy
 Fired: Andy Litinsky - for coming up with a terrible idea for the bottle and for his unprofessional behavior to the Pepsi employees. He also let himself get bombarded by Sandy and Jennifer during the boardroom, which did not show any of his abilities as a debate champion. Trump said afterwards he had planned initially to fire Sandy but her impressive defense in the Boardroom changed his mind.
Notes:
 When Sandy and Jennifer left the boardroom and got on the elevator Sandy continued to argue with Jennifer over the conversation she and Andy had before the boardroom
 Episode Twelve recap at NBC.com
 Read the Episode 12 Recap at Yahoo!'s Apprentice 2 Website

Week 13: Sweet & Lowdown
 Airdate: December 2
 Apex project manager: Ivana
 Mosaic project manager: Sandy
 Task: The two teams are assigned to produce and sell the M-AZING candy bar, a new product from M&M Mars. The team that makes the most profit from selling the candy bars is the winner.
 Judges: Donald Trump; Carolyn Kepcher; George H. Ross
 Trump Monologue: Know Your Enemy - Trump says, the worst thing one can do is to underestimate one's opponent. Though an opponent may seem weak, they could be the toughest, smartest person in the world.
 Result: Apex produces about 323 candy bars, while Mosaic produces only about 290 candy bars.
 Winning team: Mosaic
 Reasons for win: Despite making fewer candy bars, Jennifer M. and Sandy priced their candy bars higher for $5.00 than Apex did, which gave them a greater overall revenue. The women also wore flashy outfits (part of their marketing material), which attracted them to their buyers. They made their total profit of $1,023.11.
 Reward: Flying to Chicago to meet Bill Rancic at the Trump International Hotel and Tower Chicago.
 Losing team: Apex
 Reasons for loss: Apex's price point was too low, and Kevin started selling his candy bars even lower after being initially unsuccessful with the set price. Ivana also acted in a completely unprofessional manner by dropping her skirt to sell a candy bar to a man for $20 on Wall Street, which wasn't enough to win. They only made a total profit of $560.75.
 Initial Boardroom: Donald grilled Apex of how did Mosaic did better who hated each other in the previous boardroom, but isn't getting a thorough explanation. When asked of PM records from Carolyn, Ivana of 0–2, Kevin of 2–0, & Kelly of 3–0. Trump was very displeased with Ivana's record of 5-8 & she angrily exclaimed that Jennifer M. also had the same record although Jennifer's PM record was 1-0 (on the winning team), but she struggled to make a case how she was stronger than Kevin & Kelly, including Jennifer M. although she was on the winning team. George felt Kevin & Kelly were liable for pricing the team's candy bars too low but Carolyn was offended by what Ivana did on Wall Street; described it "horrendous" and Trump mentioned that Ivana was "stripping" with her active gimmick.
 Sent to boardroom: Ivana, Kevin, Kelly
 Fired: Ivana Ma - for her terrible PM record of 0–2, horrible team record of 5–8, for failing to make a case as to why Kevin should be fired (instead targeting Kelly, who had exemption from the previous week, and then Jennifer M., who was on the winning team), and for her extreme unprofessionalism, which included her act of desperation on Wall Street.
 Episode Thirteen recap at NBC.com
 Read the Episode 13 Recap at Yahoo!'s Apprentice 2 Website
 Notes:
 Ironically, Ivana had said in task 2 that she'd rather lose with dignity than resort to using her sexuality to sell something. This would completely contradict her performance in this task, when she was willing to drop her skirt to anyone who would give her $20 for her candy bar.
 Kelly's exemption from the previous week meant that he was not in danger of being fired (unless he did "something incredibly stupid" as Trump put it, which may have been a reference to Bradford's actions in Week 2), but Trump had him come back to the final boardroom anyway, to help decide whether Ivana or Kevin should be fired.
 Right before he fired Ivana, Trump stated that it was because he did not want to hire a stripper.
 In her exit interview, Ivana defended herself, claiming that she was wearing more than Mosaic (which was arguably untrue) and that she had worn even less at the gym, and saying that albeit it wasn't her proudest moment, she was able to successfully sell her item.

Week 14: Intellectual Horsepower 
 Airdate: December 9
 Prologue: Teams, rewards, and project managers no longer apply per the final four candidates, and Trump showed the final four a preview on how he views the life of The Apprentice.
 Trump Monologue: Winning Is Everything - There's no better feeling than being a winner. In order to be a winner, one has to be positive and think like a winner with no intention of giving up.
 Task scope: The candidates will go for one-on-one interviews with four prolific executives. These executive will personally interview the final four candidates and then advise Trump on which two candidates should be fired. The interviewers are as follows:
 Alan Jope, Chief Operating Officer of Unilever
 Dawn Hudson, President of Pepsi-Cola North America
 Alan "Ace" Greenberg, Chairman of Bear Stearns
 Robert Kraft, Owner of the NFL's New England Patriots.
 Boardroom details: The executives unanimously liked Kelly, even though one felt he was a bit stiff, as they felt he was good as both a leader and a follower and liked that he had a military history. The interviewers liked Kevin, but found him to be aimless, and stressed to Trump that they would not hire anyone with excessive uncertainty. Although the interviewers liked Jennifer M., they felt that she was just giving them what they wanted to hear, rather than what she really had to say. The executives did like Sandy, but they deemed her unworthy of working for Trump, mainly because they were unsure of her ability to transition into a corporate environment and worried about her lack of a college degree.
 Fired:
 Kevin Allen - for excessive procrastination and failure to pursue a strong professional career path due to his lengthy educational efforts.
 Sandy Ferreira - for unmet skills in the corporate world.
 Episode Fourteen recap at NBC.com
 Read the Episode 14 Recap at Yahoo!'s Apprentice 2 Website

Final Task: The Task of All Tasks
 Airdate: Part one was televised on December 9, and part two was televised on December 16
 Tasks:
 Jennifer M.: an NBA Charity Task, involving professional basketball players, including Chris Webber
 Kelly: a polo match which would be followed by a concert starring Tony Bennett
 Teams:
 Mosaic: Jennifer M. with Chris, Pamela, and Stacy R.
 Apex: Kelly with Elizabeth, John, and Raj
 Judges: Donald Trump; Carolyn Kepcher; George H. Ross
 Kelly said that the last two candidates he had to pick from to round out his team (Raj and Stacy R.) had identical abilities, and that he chose Raj because Raj's preppy outfit was a "good fit" for their polo match task.
 Jen didn't want Stacy R. on her team and made a quiet comment to that effect to Pamela after the teams gathered, but Stacy R. overheard the remark and shocked Jen by informing her that she didn't belong in the Final 2 at all (she said that Sandy should have gotten the other spot) and that if Jen didn't want to be completely embarrassed by Kelly she needed to stop being an asshole and start leading for once. Jen apologized and took Stacy R.'s work seriously for the rest of the task.
 Kelly was so pissed off about Raj and John's lazy, unproductive actions that he considered firing or sidelining them, but ultimately kept them in place (and they ended up working hard and doing a good job for him on the tasks). Like the Kwame-Omarosa fiasco in Season 1, fans were left wondering without clarification if Kelly actually COULD have fired them, or if he had no choice but to manage them no matter how badly they performed. In Season 3, George Ross finally made it explicit by telling the Final 2 that "bosses are free to use employees any way they want to."
 In spite of what the episode showed, it was revealed that Chris Webber never even heard of the event, and his name was included to give Jen's team the responsibility of figuring out how to "replace" him at the charity task. Webber later said he would have appeared if he had been given notice or asked directly by Donald Trump.

Decision Time 
 Airdate: December 16, the conclusion to the Season Finale was televised live from Alice Tully Hall at Lincoln Center, New York City with Regis Philbin as event emcee.
 Decision: Sandy, Kevin, Ivana, Wes, and Chris felt that Kelly should win. Andy and Pamela felt that Jennifer M. should win.
 Hired: Kelly Perdew - for his proven record and expertise was preferred over Jennifer M.'s, even though Trump cited that Kelly couldn't bring a military background to business and had doubts over Kelly's leadership style (despite his 3–0 record as project manager).
 Fired: Jennifer Massey - for excessive losses in the tasks (5–8) and for her unpopularity with most of the other candidates. It was also the first time a runner-up was told in the finale: "You're fired".
 What is next for Kelly: Kelly decided to oversee a project in New York City over the other choice on the Las Vegas Strip.
 See the Episode 15 Recap at NBC.com.

External links
 NBC.com: The Apprentice 2
 Yahoo!'s Apprentice 2 Website with Unaired Footage and Detailed Outcomes
 Week 11
 Episode Eleven recap at NBC.com
 Read the Episode 11 Recap at Yahoo!'s Apprentice 2 Website

2004 American television seasons
02